The criticism of Linux focuses on issues concerning use of operating systems which use the Linux kernel.

While the Linux-based Android operating system dominates the smartphone market in many countries, and Linux is used on the New York Stock Exchange and most supercomputers, it is used in few desktop and laptop computers. Much of the criticism of Linux is related to the lack of desktop and laptop adoption, although as of 2015 there has been growing unease with the project's perspective on security and its adoption of systemd has been controversial.

Linux kernel criticisms

Kernel development politics
Some security professionals say that the rise in prominence of operating system-level virtualization using Linux has raised the profile of attacks against the kernel, and that Linus Torvalds is reticent to add mitigations against kernel-level attacks in official releases. Linux 4.12, released in 2017, enabled KASLR by default, but its effectiveness is debated.

Con Kolivas, a former kernel developer, tried to optimize the kernel scheduler for interactive desktop use. He finally dropped the support for his patches due to the lack of appreciation for his development. In the 2007 interview Why I quit: kernel developer Con Kolivas he stated:

Kernel performance
At LinuxCon 2009, Linux creator Linus Torvalds said that the Linux kernel has become "bloated and huge":

At LinuxCon 2014, Torvalds said he thinks the bloat situation is better because modern PCs are a lot faster:

Kernel code quality
In an interview with German newspaper Zeit Online in November 2011, Linus Torvalds stated that Linux has become "too complex" and he was concerned that developers would not be able to find their way through the software anymore. He complained that even subsystems have become very complex and he told the publication that he is "afraid of the day" when there will be an error that "cannot be evaluated anymore."

Andrew Morton, one of Linux kernel lead developers, explains that many bugs identified in Linux are never fixed:

Theo de Raadt, founder of OpenBSD, compares OpenBSD development process to Linux:

Desktop use

Critics of Linux on the desktop have frequently argued that a lack of top-selling video games on the platform holds adoption back. For instance, as of September 2015, the Steam gaming service has 1,500 games available on Linux, compared to 2,323 games for Mac and 6,500 Windows games.

As of October 2021, Proton, a Steam-backed development effort descended from Wine provides compatibility with a large number of Windows-only games, and potentially better performance over Linux-native ports in some cases. ProtonDB is a community-maintained effort to gauge how well different versions of Proton work with a given game.

As a desktop operating system, Linux has been criticized on a number of fronts, including:
 A confusing number of choices of distributions, and desktop environments.
 Poor open source support for some hardware, in particular drivers for 3D graphics chips, where manufacturers were unwilling to provide full specifications. As a result, many video cards have both open and closed source drivers, usually with different levels of support.
 Limited availability of widely used commercial applications (such as Adobe Photoshop and Microsoft Word). This is a result of the software developers not supporting Linux rather than any fault of Linux itself. Sometimes this can be solved by running the Windows versions of these programs through Wine, a virtual machine, or dual-booting. Even so, this creates a chicken or the egg situation where developers make programs for Windows due to its market share, and consumers use Windows due to availability of the programs.

Distribution fragmentation 
Another common complaint levelled against Linux is the abundance of distributions available. As of November, 2021, DistroWatch lists 275 distributions. While Linux advocates have defended the number as an example of freedom of choice, other critics cite the large number as cause for confusion and lack of standardization in Linux operating systems. Alexander Wolfe wrote in InformationWeek:

Caitlyn Martin from LinuxDevCenter has been critical of the number of Linux distributions:

Hardware support
In recent decades (since the established dominance of Microsoft Windows) hardware developers have often been reluctant to provide full technical documentation for their products, to allow drivers to be written. This has meant that a Linux user had to carefully hand pick the hardware that made up the system to ensure functionality and compatibility. These problems have largely been addressed:

At one time, Linux systems required removable media, such as floppy discs and CD-ROMs, to be manually mounted before they could be accessed. Mounting media is now automatic in nearly all distributions, with the development of the udev.

Some companies, such as EmperorLinux, have addressed the problems of laptop hardware compatibility by mating modified Linux distributions with specially selected hardware to ensure compatibility from delivery.

Directory structure
The traditional directory structure, which is a heritage from Linux's Unix roots in the 1970s, has been criticized as inappropriate for desktop end users. Some Linux distributions like GoboLinux and moonOS have proposed alternative hierarchies that were argued to be easier for end users, though they achieved little acceptance.

Criticism by Microsoft
In 2004, Microsoft initiated its Get the Facts marketing campaign, which specifically criticized Linux server usage. In particular, it claimed that the vulnerabilities of Windows are fewer in number than those of Linux distributions, that Windows is more reliable and secure than Linux, that the total cost of ownership of Linux is higher (due to complexity, acquisition costs, and support costs), that use of Linux places a burden of liability on businesses, and that "Linux vendors provide little, if any indemnification coverage." In addition, the corporation published various studies in an attempt to prove this – the factuality of which has been heavily disputed by different authors who claim that Microsoft's comparisons are flawed. Many Linux distributors now offer indemnification to customers.

Internal Microsoft reports from the Halloween documents leak have presented conflicting views. Particularly documents from 1998 and 1999 ceded that "Linux ... is trusted in mission critical applications, and – due to its open source code – has a long term credibility which exceeds many other competitive OSs", "An advanced Win32 GUI user would have a short learning cycle to become productive [under Linux]", "Long term, my simple experiments do indicate that Linux has a chance at the desktop market ...", and "Overall respondents felt the most compelling reason to support OSS was that it 'Offers a low total cost of ownership (TCO)'."

Responses to criticism
The Linux community has had mixed responses to these and other criticisms. As mentioned above, while some criticism has led to new features and better user-friendliness, the Linux community as a whole has a reputation for being resistant to criticism. Writing for PC World, Keir Thomas, noted that, "Most of the time the world of Linux tends to be anti-critical. If anybody in the community dares be critical, they get stomped upon." In a 2015 interview, Linus Torvalds also mentioned the tendency of Linux desktop environment projects to blame their users instead of themselves in case of criticism.

See also 
 Criticism of desktop Linux
 Criticism of Microsoft Windows
 The Unix-Haters Handbook

References 

Linux
Linux